Benoît Michaud (April 16, 1902 – August 29, 1949) was a lawyer, notary, judge and political figure in New Brunswick. He represented Restigouche County in the Legislative Assembly of New Brunswick from 1944 to 1945 and Restigouche—Madawaska in the House of Commons of Canada from 1945 to 1949 as a Liberal member.

He was born in Grand Falls, New Brunswick. He died at the age of 47.

References 
 

1902 births
1949 deaths
Liberal Party of Canada MPs
New Brunswick Liberal Association MLAs
Members of the House of Commons of Canada from New Brunswick
Canadian notaries
People from Grand Falls, New Brunswick